Carl Busse may refer to:

 Carl Busse (architect) (1834–1896), German architect and master builder
 Carl Hermann Busse (1872–1918), German lyric poet
Carl Busse (actor) in The Prince of Rogues